Aapas ki Baat Najam Sethi Kay Sath (in Urdu:اپس کی بات نجم سیٹھی کے ساتھ) is an airing show on Geo News which airs from Monday to Thursday at 11:00pm–12:00am. The show gives political analysis on current affairs of Pakistan. The show cast also predicts about future of political affairs in show under the given limits and code of conduct of channel. This airing show is considered to be one of the most successful and popular airing show of country. Aapas ki Baat is a discussion-based talk show which is different from usual format of Pakistani talk shows. Najam Sethi expresses his views in and draws attention to the happenings in the political area of Pakistan.

References

External links
geo.tv
affairs.com.pk

Geo News
Pakistani television talk shows